Momordenol (3β-hydroxy-stigmasta-5,14-dien-16-one) is a natural chemical compound,  a sterol found in the fresh fruit of the bitter melon (Momordica charantia).

The compound is soluble in ethyl acetate and methanol but not in pure chloroform or petrol. It crystallizes as fine needles that melt at 160–161 °C.   It was isolated in 1997 by S. Begum and others.

See also 
 Momordicilin
 Momordicin I
 Momordicin-28
 Momordicinin
 Momordol
 Stigmasterol

References 

Phytosterols
Ketones
Sterols